Ronald "Ron" Rylance (11 March 1924 – 11 January 1998) was an English World Cup winning professional rugby league footballer who played as a  and  in the 1940s and 1950s. He played at representative level for England and Yorkshire, and at club level for Wakefield Trinity, Castleford, Dewsbury and Huddersfield.

Background
Rylance was born in Wakefield, West Riding of Yorkshire, England, and he died aged 73 in Wakefield, West Yorkshire, England, and he is buried Sugar Lane Cemetery, Wakefield, that is adjacent to Belle Vue stadium.

Playing career
Rylance made his début for Wakefield Trinity in the 27–2 victory over Broughton Rangers at Belle Vue on Saturday 6 September 1941. In 1950, he was transferred from Wakefield Trinity to Dewsbury. In August 1951, he moved to Huddersfield. he appears to have scored no

International honours
Rylance won a cap for England while at Wakefield Trinity in 1947 against Wales.

He was in the Great Britain squad while at Huddersfield for the 1954 Rugby League World Cup in France, but did not participate in any of the four matches.

County honours
Rylance was selected for Yorkshire County XIII while at Wakefield Trinity during the 1945/46 and 1946/47 seasons.

Challenge Cup Final appearances
Rylance played , i.e. number 2, in Wakefield Trinity's 13–12 victory over Wigan in the 1945–46 Challenge Cup Final during the 1945–46 season at Wembley Stadium, London on Saturday 4 May 1946, in front of a crowd of 54,730.

County Cup Final appearances
Rylance played  in Wakefield Trinity's 2–5 defeat by Bradford Northern in the 1945–46 Yorkshire County Cup Final during the 1945–46 season at Thrum Hall, Halifax on Saturday 3 November 1945, played right-, i.e. number 3, and scored a try in the 10–0 victory over Hull F.C. in the 1946–47 Yorkshire County Cup Final during the 1946–47 season at Headingley Rugby Stadium, Leeds on Saturday 31 November 1946, he did not play in the 7–7 draw with Leeds in the 1947–48 Yorkshire County Cup Final during the 1947–48 season at Fartown Ground, Huddersfield on Saturday 1 November 1947, and played , i.e. number 5, and was captain in the 8–7 victory over Leeds in the 1947–48 Yorkshire County Cup Final replay during the 1947–48 season at Odsal Stadium, Bradford on Wednesday 5 November 1947.

Contemporaneous Article Extract
"Played RU with Wakefield Q.E. Grammar School, but had experience of RL in workshop competitions before joining Wakefield Trinity in 1943. In '45/6 he scored 113 points in 11 weeks – a remarkable scoring run. Gained Yorkshire and England recognition. Dewsbury paid record fee for his transfer in 1950, after which he later joined Huddersfield before returning to Belle Vue as a committee member."

Genealogical information
Ron Rylance's marriage to Betty (née Reyner) was registered during fourth ¼ 1948 in Wakefield district. They had 4 children; Ronald Mike Rylance born in Wakefield district), sports journalist and editor (Rugby Leaguer & League Express and Rugby League World), and author, Elizabeth in Dewsbury district), Fiona in Wakefield district), and Louise born in Northampton).

References

External links

1924 births
1998 deaths
Castleford Tigers players
Dewsbury Rams players
England national rugby league team players
English rugby league players
Huddersfield Giants players
Rugby league players from Wakefield
Rugby league five-eighths
Rugby league fullbacks
Rugby league wingers
Wakefield Trinity captains
Wakefield Trinity players
Yorkshire rugby league team players